The Southern Conference for Human Welfare (SCHW) (1938-1948) was an organization that sought to promote New Deal-type reforms to the South in terms of social justice, civil rights, and electoral reform.  It folded due to funding problems and allegations of Communist sympathies; its successor was the former sub-group the Education Fund.

History

Background

During latter years of the Great Depression, US President Franklin Delano Roosevelt (FDR) recognized that many New Deal programs were failing in the US South. In 1938, he convened a group of  southern, liberal scholars and writers to investigate conditions.  Their investigation resulted in A Report on the Economic Conditions of the South, calling the South "the nation's number one economic problem" based on low wages (and resulting low incomes) as well as public services.  Two members of the group were Joseph Gelders, an organizer for the CPUSA's International Labor Defense, and  Lucy Randolph Mason, scion of the famed Randolph family of Virginia, then public-relations representative for the Congress of Industrial Organizations ("CIO") in the South. They advocated for a regional conference "to address the repression of civil liberties in southern cities," which both FDR and wife Eleanor Roosevelt embraced.

Founding

On November 20, 1938, the Southern Conference for Human Welfare convened for the first time in the Municipal Auditorium of Birmingham, Alabama. Attendees numbered 1,200, a quarter of whom were African American.  They included: United States Supreme Court Justice Hugo Black; Works Progress Administration director Aubrey Willis Williams, civil rights activist Mary McLeod Bethune, Highlander Folk School co-founder James Dombrowski, Alabama governor Bibb Graves, and activist Virginia Foster Durr. SCHW's "interracial nature was particularly unsettling for many white southerners" and experienced disruption by segregationists, leading to negative publicity in local newspapers.

Activities

Many politicians soon left the SCHW due to public perception as a Communist front. In her memoir, Virginia Durr recalled that the SCHW was "red-baited constantly."  Attackers included prominent New York lawyer Morris Ernst of both the American Civil Liberties Union (ACLU) and National Lawyers Guild (NLG)–where Ernst had also led internal anti-communist efforts.

SCHW also experienced a "chronic shortage" of funding.  It cancelled its 1939 convention.  It had a hard time paying meager salaries to staff. After the end of World War II, celebrities (e.g., Frank Sinatra, Orson Welles) helped raise funding, which led to creation of a subsidiary Southern Conference Educational Fund (SCEF), an educational and non-political arm, headed by James Dombrowski of the Highlander Folk School.  As SCEF formed, membership in SCHW declined.  Labor unions, e.g., the American Federation of Labor (AFL) and the CIO, already facing pressure from new regulations in the 1947 Taft-Hartley Act, distanced themselves from the SCHW as a Communist-tainted, radical organization.  Meanwhile, the SCHW refused to take a clear anti-Communist stance, which left it exposed to investigation by the House Un-American Activities Committee (HUAC) (and earlier Dies Committee). Even "stalwart supporters" like Eleanor Roosevelt distanced themselves.

Disbanding

During 1948, the SCHW split over its support for presidential candidate:  some members supported Progressive Party candidate Henry A. Wallace, others the Democratic Party's incumbent US President Harry S. Truman. SCHW officers met in November 1948 and voted to end the floundering organization.  On November 20, 1948, SCHW leaders met at Monticello, Virginia and passed a resolution to reformulate the organizations's last remaining group, the Southern Conference Educational Fund (SCEF), "committed solely to the ending of segregation in the south." Next day, November 21, 1948, SCHW leaders voted to disband.

Works
  Southern Patriot (SCEF newspaper)

See also

 Clifford Durr
 Virginia Durr
 Eleanor Roosevelt
 Franklin Delano Roosevelt

References

External links

 The Carolina Story:  A Virtual Museum of University History - Frank Porter Graham and SCHW

Organizations established in 1938
Political advocacy groups in the United States
Progressivism in the United States
Liberalism in the United States
1938 establishments in the United States
1948 establishments in the United States
United States political action committees
Left-wing politics in the United States